Lars Peter Fredén (born 9 August 1951) is a Swedish diplomat who has held several ambassadorships during his career.

Career
Working in the Swedish Foreign Service since 1982, Fredén was Ambassador to China and Mongolia from 2010 to 2016. Previous ambassadorships have taken him to Zagreb, Skopje, Pristina and Tirana. From 2003 to 2006, Fredén was the Head of the International Affairs Department at the European Space Agency in Paris. He was also the Security Policy Aid to the Prime Minister (1992–1994) and Deputy Chief of Mission in Moscow (1995–1998).

He studied at Shandong University, Peking University, and Harvard.

References

1951 births
Living people
Ambassadors of Sweden to Croatia
Ambassadors of Sweden to North Macedonia
Ambassadors of Sweden to Kosovo
Ambassadors of Sweden to Albania
Ambassadors of Sweden to China
Ambassadors of Sweden to Mongolia
Harvard University alumni
Shandong University alumni